Van Province (Armenian: Վանի մարզ) is a province in the Eastern Anatolian region of Turkey, between Lake Van and the Iranian border. It is 19,069 km2 in area and had a population of 1,128,749 at the end of 2022. Its adjacent provinces are Bitlis to the west, Siirt to the southwest, Şırnak and Hakkâri to the south, and Ağrı to the north. The capital of the province is the city of Van, with a population of 525,016 at the end of 2022. The second-largest city is Erciş, with 92,945 inhabitants at end 2022. The province is considered part of Western Armenia by Armenians and was part of ancient province of Vaspurakan. The region is considered to be the cradle of Armenian civilization. Before the Armenian genocide, Van Province was part of six Armenian vilayets. A majority of the province's modern day population is Kurdish.

Demographics 

The province is mainly populated by Kurds and considered part of Turkish Kurdistan. The province had  a significant Armenian population until the genocide in 1915.

In the same census, Muslims comprised  of the population and the remaining  being Jews.  

History 
This area was the heartland of Armenians, who lived in these areas from the time of Hayk in the 3rd millennium BCE right up to the late 19th century when the Ottoman Empire seized all the land from the natives. In the 9th century BC the Van area was the center of the Urartian kingdom. The area was a major Armenian population center. The region came under the control of the Armenian Orontids in the 7th century BC and later Persians in the mid-6th century BC. By the early 2nd century BC it was part of the Kingdom of Armenia. It became an important center during the reign of the Armenian king, Tigranes II, who founded the city of Tigranakert in the 1st century BC.

Seljuks and Ottomans 
With the Seljuq victory at the Battle of Malazgirt in 1071, just north of Lake Van, it became a part of the Seljuq Empire and later the Ottoman Empire during their century long wars with their neighboring Iranian Safavid arch rivals, in which Sultan Selim I managed to conquer the area over the latter. The area continued to be contested and was passed on between the Ottoman Empire and the Safavids (and their subsequent successors, the Afsharids and Qajars) for many centuries until the Battle of Chaldiran which set the borders till this day. During the 19th century it was reorganized as Van Vilayet.

Republic of Turkey 
In 1927 the office of the Inspector General was created, which governed with martial law. The province was included in the first Inspectorate General (Umumi Müfettişlik, UM) over which the Inspector General ruled. The UM span over the provinces of Hakkâri, Siirt, Van, Mardin, Bitlis, Sanlıurfa, Elaziğ and Diyarbakır. The Inspectorate General were dissolved in 1952 during the Government of the Democrat Party.

Between July 1987 and July 2000, Van Province was within the OHAL region, which was ruled by a Governor within a state of emergency.

Modern history 
According to the 2012 Metropolitan Municipalities Law (Law No. 6360), all Turkish provinces with a population more than 750 000, will have a metropolitan municipality and the districts within the metropolitan municipalities will be second level municipalities. The law also creates new districts within the provinces in addition to present districts. The current Governor is Mehmet Emin Bilmez.

Earthquakes 
In Van province occurred several earthquakes. In 1881 an earthquake occurred and caused the death of 95 people. In 1941, Van suffered a destructive 5.9 Mw earthquake. Two more earthquakes occurred in 2011 in which 644 people died and 2608 people were injured. In a 7.2 Mw earthquake on 23 October 2011, more than 500 people were killed. On 9 November 2011, a 5.6 Mw magnitude earthquake killed also several people and caused buildings to collapse.

Districts 
Van Province is divided into 13 districts,listed below with their populations as at the end of 2022. The former Van District is now split into İpekyolu and Tuşba districts, which between them contain almost all of the city of Van.

Gallery

See also 

 Ottoman Armenian Population
 Defense of Van (1915)
 2011 Van earthquake
 Yazidis
 2020 Van avalanches

Bibliography

References

External links 
 Pictures of the capital of this province

 
Armenian Highlands
Turkish Kurdistan